L'Etoile Sportive Aiglons Briviste-la-Gaillarde (The Sporting Star Eagles Briviste), commonly known as ESA Brive,  is a French football club based in Brive-la-Gaillarde, who currently play in the Championnat de France Amateurs 2 Group F.

History
ESA was founded in 1920 and played in the Stade André Pestourie which subsumes 3,000 places.

References

Notable alumni 
Laurent Koscielny  (born 1985) played from 1995-1997 and 1998-2002

External links
 Official site

Association football clubs established in 1920
1920 establishments in France
Sport in Corrèze
Football clubs in Nouvelle-Aquitaine